Krościenko Wyżne  is a village in Krosno County, Subcarpathian Voivodeship, in south-eastern Poland. It is the seat of the gmina (administrative district) called Gmina Krościenko Wyżne.

The village has a population of 3,700.

See also
 Walddeutsche

References

Villages in Krosno County